Bani al-Karibi is a sub-district located in Maswar District, 'Amran Governorate, Yemen. Bani al-Karibi had a population of 2263 according to the 2004 census.

References 

Sub-districts in Maswar District